The Kaiser Wilhelm Bridge ( or "Emperor William Bridge") is a swing bridge in Wilhelmshaven, Germany, and the town's landmark.

Location
The Kaiser Wilhelm Bridge connects the beach (Südstrandpromenade) with the South Quarter.

History
Construction began in 1905, and at its completion in 1907 it was Europe's longest swing bridge. The design scheme was created by Ernst Troschel, construction was executed by MAN Nuremberg.

In 1998 the rotary mechanics of the southern part of the bridge were damaged when a tugboat collided with a frigate and had to be partially repaired. In 2003, a cargo ship rammed and slightly damaged the bridge.

From September 2010 to September 2013, the bridge was closed to the public for repairs.

Specifications

The two pillars are 20.4 m tall. The maximum passage height is 9.00 m at + 1.10 m medium water-level in the harbour, the passage width is 58.60 m.

On the bridge the road traffic can only drive one way at the same time. It is controlled by traffic lights. Before it tilts out the bridge is blocked for the whole traffic by light signals and pikes.

Postage stamp
In 2007, Deutsche Post released a 1.45-euro stamp to commemorate the centennial of the bridge.

External links 

This article was translated from the German Wikipedia article on December 15, 2006.

Buildings and structures in Wilhelmshaven
Bridges completed in 1907
Swing bridges
Road bridges in Germany